Dr. Sheila Balakrishnan is an obstetrician and a gynaecologist. She has authored three books on obstetrics and gynaecology. She is currently the associate professor at the department of obstetrics and gynaecology at Government Medical college, Trivandrum. She has pursued her MD and DNB from Trivandrum Medical college. She was awarded membership at the Royal College of Obstetricians and Gynaecologists in 1994 and then conferred fellowship in the year 2008. She has received Commonwealth scholarship award in the United Kingdom. She is a member of the Federation of Obstetric and Gynaecological Societies of India (FOGSI) and the Indian College of Obstetricians and Gynaecologists. Currently, she is a member of the contraception and medical disorders committee of FOGSI. In November 2013, the medical team headed by Dr. Balakrishnan announced the birth of South India's first in vitro fertilization babies in Trivandrum Medical College Hospital. 
She has authored three books, Textbook of Obstetrics, Textbook of Gynaecology  and Clinical case discussion in Obstetrics and Gynaecology and has published numerous research papers.

References

Living people
Indian gynaecologists
Indian women gynaecologists
20th-century Indian women scientists
20th-century Indian medical doctors
Indian obstetricians
Medical doctors from Thiruvananthapuram
Women scientists from Kerala
20th-century women physicians
Year of birth missing (living people)